Melvin Dresher (born Dreszer; March 13, 1911 – June 4, 1992) was a Polish-born American mathematician, notable for developing, with Merrill Flood, the game theoretical model of cooperation and conflict known as the Prisoner's dilemma while at RAND in 1950 (Albert W. Tucker gave the game its prison-sentence interpretation, and thus the name by which it is known today).

Dresher came to the United States in 1923. He obtained his B.S. from Lehigh University in 1933 and his Ph.D. from Yale University in 1937; the title of his dissertation was "Multi-Groups: A Generalisation of the Notion of Group." Dresher worked as instructor of mathematics, Michigan State College, 1938–1941; statistician, War Production Board, 1941–1944; mathematical physicist, National Defense Research Committee, 1944–1946; professor of mathematics, Catholic University, 1946–1947; research mathematician, RAND, from 1948.

He was the author of several RAND research papers on game theory, and his widely acclaimed The Mathematics of Games of Strategy: Theory and Applications (originally published in 1961 as Games of Strategy: Theory and Applications) continues to be read today.

Dresher's research has been referred to and discussed in a variety of published books, including Prisoner's Dilemma by William Poundstone and A Beautiful Mind by Sylvia Nasar.

References
 Obituary, July 2, 1992 issue of the  Palisadian-Post newspaper (Pacific Palisades, California).
 "In Remembrance",  July 9, 1992 issue of RAND Items (a biweekly publication for employees of RAND).

1911 births
1992 deaths
Game theorists
Yale University alumni
RAND Corporation people
20th-century American mathematicians
American people of Polish-Jewish descent
Polish emigrants to the United States
People from Krasnystaw